May 14 - Eastern Orthodox Church calendar - May 16

All fixed commemorations below celebrated on May 28 by Orthodox Churches on the Old Calendar.

For May 15th, Orthodox Churches on the Old Calendar commemorate the Saints listed on May 2.

Saints
 The Seven Apostolic Men, Martyr Bishops, ordained in Rome by Saints Peter and Paul and sent to evangelize Spain (1st century):
 Saints Torquatus, Ctesiphon, Secundus, Indaletius, Caecilius, Hesychius, and Euphrasius
 Saint Achillios, Bishop of Larissa (330)
 Saint Pachomius the Great, founder of cenobitic monasticism (348)
 Saint Silvanus of Tabennisi (in the Thebaid) (4th century)
 Saint Barbarus the Myrrh-gusher of Greece (c. 820 - 829)
 Saint Panegyrios of Cyprus (Panigerios, Panegyrius), Wonderworker of Malounta

Pre-Schism Western saints
 Martyrs Cassius, Victorinus, Maximus, and their companions, in the Auvergne in France (c. 264)
 Martyr Simplicius, Bishop, in Sardinia (c. 284-305) 
 Virgin recluse Caesarea of Otranto
 Saint Hilary of Galeata (Hilary of Tuscany), founder of the monastery called Galeata, later known as Sant'Ilaro (Sant'Ellero di Galeata) (558)
 Saint Colmán of Oughaval (Colman mac Ua Laoighse, Colman Mc O'Laoighse), a disciple of St Columba and St Fintan of Clonenagh (6th century)
 Virgin-martyr Dymphna of Geel, Flanders (c. 650)
 Saint Waldalenus, founder of monastery of Bèze in France (7th century)
 Saint Bercthun (Bertin), a disciple of St John of Beverley and first Abbot of Beverley in England (733)
 Saint Bertha of Bingen (c. 757), and her son Saint Rupert of Bingen (732)

Post-Schism Orthodox saints
 Saint Isaiah of Rostov, Bishop and Wonderworker (1090)
 Saint Isaiah of the Kiev Caves, wonderworker (1115)
 Saint Andrew the Hermit, of Mt. Kalana, Epirus, wonderworker (c. 1237 - 1271)
  of Nerekhta, abbot (1384), and Saint Silvanus of Nerekhta (1384)
 Saint Euphrosynus of Pskov (Eleazar), abbot and wonderworker (1481)
 Saint Serapion of Pskov, disciple of St Euphrosynus of Pskov  (1481)
 Saint Pachomius of Keno Lake Monastery (1525)
 Saint Demetrius of Moscow the Wonderworker, Slain Crown Prince (1591)
 Saint Arethas of Valaam and Verkhoturye (1903)

New martyrs and confessors
 New Hieromartyrs:
 Archbishop Pachomius (Kedrov) of Chernigov (1938),
 his brother, Archbishop Abercius (Kedrov) of Zhitomir (1937),
 their father, Priest Nicholas Kedrov (1936),
 their brother-in-law, Priest Vladimir Zagarsky (1937)

Other commemorations
 Discovery of the revered icon of Kamoulianos "Acheiropoieta" ("made without human hands").
 Translation of the sacred relics of the Holy Apostle Titus of Crete, from Venice (which had taken the relics in 1669), back to the Greek Orthodox Archdiocese of Crete (1966)
 Uncovering of the relics (1846) of Saint Tikhon, Bishop of Voronezh, wonderworker of Zadonsk (1783)

Icon gallery

Notes

References

Sources
 May. Self-Ruled Antiochian Orthodox Christian Archdiocese of North America.
 May 15/28. Orthodox Calendar (PRAVOSLAVIE.RU).
 May 28 / May 15. HOLY TRINITY RUSSIAN ORTHODOX CHURCH (A parish of the Patriarchate of Moscow).
 May 15. OCA - The Lives of the Saints.
 Complete List of Saints. Protection of the Mother of God Church (POMOG).
 May 15. Latin Saints of the Orthodox Patriarchate of Rome.
 May 15. The Roman Martyrology.
Greek Sources
 Great Synaxaristes:  15 ΜΑΪΟΥ . ΜΕΓΑΣ ΣΥΝΑΞΑΡΙΣΤΗΣ.
  Συναξαριστής. 15 Μαΐου. ECCLESIA.GR. (H ΕΚΚΛΗΣΙΑ ΤΗΣ ΕΛΛΑΔΟΣ). 
Russian Sources
  28 мая (15 мая). Православная Энциклопедия под редакцией Патриарха Московского и всея Руси Кирилла (электронная версия). (Orthodox Encyclopedia - Pravenc.ru).
  15 мая (ст.ст.) 28 мая 2013 (нов. ст.). Русская Православная Церковь Отдел внешних церковных связей. (DECR).

May in the Eastern Orthodox calendar